Eyemouth railway station served the village of Eyemouth, Scottish Borders, Scotland from 1891 to 1962 on the Eyemouth Railway.

History 
The station opened on 13 April 1891 by the North British Railway. The Eye Water flooded on 12 August 1948, which caused the station to close the day after, although it reopened on 29 June 1949. It closed again, along with the branch, to both passengers and goods traffic on 5 February 1962.

References

External links 

Disused railway stations in the Scottish Borders
Former North British Railway stations
Railway stations in Great Britain opened in 1891
Railway stations in Great Britain closed in 1962
1891 establishments in Scotland
1962 disestablishments in Scotland
Eyemouth